Khachatur Kyapanaktsyan (June 24, 1968 – September 30, 2007) was an Armenian weightlifter. He set two world records in the snatch.

Kyapanaktsyan was born in Leninakan, Armenian SSR (now Gyumri, Armenia), a city known for producing elite weightlifters. He won a gold medal at the 1993 European Weightlifting Championships and competed at the 1996 Summer Olympics. Kyapanaktsyan also set two world records, both in the snatch.

On September 30, 2007, Kyapanaktsyan died at the age of 39 in a car accident on the Gyumri-Vanadzor highway.

References

External links
 Khachatur Kyapanaktsyan at Lift Up
 Sports-Reference.com

2007 deaths
Sportspeople from Gyumri
Soviet male weightlifters
Armenian male weightlifters
Olympic weightlifters of Armenia
Weightlifters at the 1996 Summer Olympics
1968 births
Soviet Armenians
Road incident deaths in Armenia
European champions in weightlifting
European champions for Armenia
European Weightlifting Championships medalists